The qualifying tournaments to the 2012 CONCACAF Under-20 Women's Championship, the North American continent's youth football championships started in August 2011. The qualification process was divided into the Central American and Caribbean zone. Canada, Mexico and the United States were automatically qualified to the final tournament.

Central America qualifying

The group winners qualify for the 2012 CONCACAF Under-20 Women's Championship

Group 1

Group 2

Caribbean qualifying

First round

The winner and runner-up from each group advance to the second round.

Group A

Group B

Group C

Group D

Second round

The group winners and the best runner-up qualified for the 2012 CONCACAF Under-20 Women's Championship.

Group A

Group B

External links
Tournament results at RSSSF

qual
CON
2012 in youth sport
2012